Geville (also Géville) is a commune in the Meuse department in Grand Est in north-eastern France.

Geography
The commune counts three small villages: Jouy-sous-les-Côtes and Corniéville, in its southern part; Gironville-sous-les-Côtes, in its northern part.

The Rupt de Mad has its source in the commune.

See also
Communes of the Meuse department
Parc naturel régional de Lorraine

References

Communes of Meuse (department)